Dorstenia peruviana is a plant species in the family Moraceae which is native to Peru and Bolivia.

References

peruviana
Plants described in 1982
Flora of Bolivia
Flora of Peru